Tradescantia subaspera, the zigzag spiderwort, is a species of flowering plant in the family Commelinaceae, native to the eastern United States. Its zigzagging stems and wider leaves distinguish it from Tradescantia virginiana. It is recommended for shady naturalistic garden settings. It has three petals which are violet-blue to purple in color. Flowers bloom May to September.

Subtaxa
The following varieties are accepted:
Tradescantia subaspera var. montana 
Tradescantia subaspera var. subaspera

References

subaspera
Garden plants of North America
Endemic flora of the United States
Flora of Illinois
Flora of Missouri
Flora of the Southeastern United States
Flora of Indiana
Flora of Pennsylvania
Flora of West Virginia
Flora of New York (state)
Plants described in 1813
Flora without expected TNC conservation status